Magrath may refer to:
 Magrath, Alberta, a town in Cardston County, Alberta, Canada.
 Magrath (surname)
 Mayor Magrath Drive, a roadway in Lethbridge, Alberta

See also
 McGrath (disambiguation)